Radaelli is a surname. Notable people with the surname include:

Fernando Chemin Radaelli (born 1982), Brazilian footballer
Giuseppe Radaelli (1833–1882), Milanese fencer and soldier
Paolo Radaelli (born 1961), Italian physicist and academic